Uribarri is a station on line 3 of the Bilbao metro. The station is also served by Euskotren Trena commuter and regional rail services. The station is located in the neighbourhood of Uribarri, part of the district with the same name, in Bilbao. It opened on 8 April 2017.

Station layout 

Uribarri follows the same cavern-like station layout shared by most underground stations of the system, designed by Norman Foster, with the main hall located suspended directly above the tracks.

Entrances 

  11 Travesía Uribarri C
  7 San Valentín de Berriotxoa St.
  Escuelas de Uribarri Plaza
  15 Zumalakarregi Av. (Zumalakarregi exit)
   Travesía Uribarri C, Monte Izaro St.

Services 
Unlike the two other lines of the Bilbao metro system (which are operated by Metro Bilbao S.A.), line 3 is operated by Euskotren, which runs it as part of the Euskotren Trena network. Trains from the Bilbao-San Sebastián, Txorierri and Urdaibai lines of the network run through line 3.

Gallery

References

External links
 

Line 3 (Bilbao metro) stations
Euskotren Trena stations
Railway stations in Spain opened in 2017
Buildings and structures in Bilbao
2017 establishments in the Basque Country (autonomous community)